Goniothalamus gardneri is a species of plant in the Annonaceae family. It is endemic to Sri Lanka.

Culture
Known as ක‍ටු කෙර (katu kera) in Sinhala.

References

Flora of Sri Lanka
gardneri
Endangered plants
Taxonomy articles created by Polbot
Taxa named by Joseph Dalton Hooker
Taxa named by Thomas Thomson (botanist)